The Brawley Peaks are a mountain range in Mono County, California.

References 

Mountain ranges of Northern California
Mountain ranges of Mono County, California